Benapole is a township in Sharsha Upazila in the Jessore District of Bangladesh. The Petrapole Customs station of India is situated across the border and since 1971 (some sources say 1947), many people have travelled between Bangladesh and India through Benapole Customs / Land port station. The railway link between Bangladesh and India through Benapole was discontinued when war broke out between Pakistan and India in September 1965 (during this time, modern day Bangladesh was part of Pakistan, known as East Pakistan). Urbanization of Benapole started in the 1990s along the Grand Trunk Road. In April 1971, the operational area of the sector 8 comprised the districts of Kushtia, Jessore, Khulna, Barisal, Faridpur and Patuakhali. At the end of May the sector was reconstituted and comprised the districts of Kuhstia, Jessore, Khulna, Satkhira and the northern part of Faridpur district. Benapole served as the headquarters of sector 8 in the liberation war. It has the largest land port in south Asia.

Customs
On the Bangladesh-India land border, Benapole land port is the most important land port of Bangladesh and is operated by the Bangladesh Land Port Authority (BLPA). About 90% of the imported Indian goods enter Bangladesh through this port. Geographically Benapole is a major strategical point for border trading between India and Bangladesh owing ito its proximity to Kolkata. According to Land Port Authority, approximately 90 percent of the total imported items from India come through Benapole. Primarily Benapole land port was an Land Customs station and gradually it turned into a Customs Division (1984) and later Custom House (1997) in response to its rising importance as in terms of import volume.

As of 2009, 143 staff including 9 officials and 134 employees are working at the Benapole land port. In fiscal year 1996-97 revenue realized from Benapole land port was around Taka 5 billion, at present it is Taka 8.50 billion.

Benapole land port is also lucrative for Indian exporters for its cheaper service and equipment charges.  Indian goods receive duty exemption advantage in this land port. The Indian Government has also decided to give priority to export in Bangladesh through Benapole-Petrapole border. Kolkata, one of the commercial hubs of India, is only 80 kilometers away from the Petrapole-Benapole border and is involved in development in the area.

Benapole had witnessed a rise of imports by 15 – 20 percent each year. It has become a significant revenue generator for the government since late 1980s. However, port facilities remain under-developed as yet. Carriability of the road from Benapole to Jessopre is limited notwithstanding regular maintenance. A two-member consultant team of the Asian Development Bank (ADB) is working to sort out improvement areas in the immigration and customs of the land port and also studying feasibility of Benapole-Petropole border as a corridor of transit in this South Asian region.

See also
 Benapole Border Crossing

References

External links

 
Populated places in Khulna Division
Communications in Bangladesh